The Suite for Jazz Orchestra No. 1 (commonly known as Jazz Suite No. 1) by Dmitri Shostakovich was composed in 1934.

Structure
The suite has three movements:

It is scored for 3 saxophones (soprano, alto and tenor), 2 trumpets, trombone, wood block, snare drum, cymbals, glockenspiel, xylophone, banjo, Hawaiian guitar, piano, violin and double bass. The premiere was on March 24, 1934. A performance takes about 8 minutes.

Shostakovich used the waltz in his 1935 ballet The Limpid Stream.

Notable recordings
 Concertgebouw Orchestra Amsterdam conducted by Riccardo Chailly (DECCA)
 National Symphony Orchestra of Ukraine, conducted by Theodore Kuchar  (Brilliant Classics)
 Philadelphia Orchestra conducted by Mariss Jansons (EMI)
 Russian Philharmonic Orchestra conducted by Dmitry Yablonsky (Naxos)

See also 
 Suite for Jazz Orchestra No. 2

References

External links
 Work details, note by Gerard McBurney
 , Concertgebouw Orchestra, Riccardo Chailly

Jazz Orchestra No. 1
1934 compositions